This page covers important events in the sport of tennis in 2018. Primarily, it provides the results of notable tournaments throughout the year on both the ATP and WTA Tours, the Davis Cup, and the Fed Cup.

ITF

Grand Slam events

Davis Cup

Fed Cup

Important events

Other tennis events
 December 30, 2017 – January 6: 2018 Hopman Cup in  Perth
 In the final,  defeated , 2–1.
 September 21–23: 2018 Laver Cup in  Chicago
  Team Europe defeated  Team World, 13–8, to win their second Laver Cup title.

Non ATP or WTA tournaments
 December 23 & 24, 2017: 2017 World Tennis Thailand Championship  Hua Hin
  Simona Halep defeated  Karolína Plíšková, 6–2, 6–3.  Johanna Konta took third place.
 December 28–30, 2017: 2017 Mubadala World Tennis Championship in  Abu Dhabi
  Kevin Anderson defeated  Roberto Bautista Agut 6–4, 77–60.  Dominic Thiem took third place.
 December 21–23: Hawaii Open in  Honolulu

Beach tennis

ITF Beach Tennis Tour

15, 000 $
 January 26–28: #1 in  Santos
 Men's doubles:  Nikita Burmakin &  Alessandro Calbucci
 Women's doubles:  Flaminia Daina &  Patricia Diaz
 March 2–4: #2 in  Salinas
 Men's doubles:  Tommaso Giovannini &  Andrea Stuto
 Women's doubles:  Flaminia Daina &  Patricia Diaz
 March 16–18: #3 in  Saint-Gilles
 Men's doubles:  Michele Cappelletti &  Luca Carli
 Women's doubles:  Sofia Cimatti &  Flaminia Daina
 April 21 & 22: #4 in  Las Palmas

10, 000 $
 January 5–7: #1 in  Monopoli
 Men's doubles:  Mikael Alessi &  Antomi Ramos-Viera
 Women's doubles:  Federica Bacchetta &  Giulia Gasparri
 February 3 & 4: #2 in  Fortaleza
 Men's doubles:  Alessandro Calbucci &  Michele Cappelletti
 Women's doubles:  Maraike Biglmaier &  Rafaella Miller
 Mixed doubles:  Lorena Melo &  Miguel Duque de Souza
 March 30 – April 1: #3 in  Le Carbet
 Men's doubles:  Nikita Burmakin &  Sergey Kuptsov
 Women's doubles:  Nadia Johnston &  Nicole Melch

6,500 $
 March 31 & April 1: #1 in  Roseto degli Abruzzi
 Men's doubles:  Matteo Marighella &  Nicolò Strano
 Women's doubles:  Veronica Casadei &  Nicole Nobile

2,500 $
 January 27 & 28: #1 in  Mougins
 Men's doubles:  Gregorio Barison &  Antomi Ramos-Viera
 Women's doubles:  Alessia Angelini &  Natascia Sciolti
 February 10 & 11: #2 in  Moscow
 Men's doubles:  Nikita Burmakin &  Sergey Kuptsov
 Women's doubles:  Ekaterina Kirgizova &  Regina Livanova
 February 17 & 18: #3 in  San Lazzaro di Savena
 Men's doubles:  Luca Cramarossa &  Marco Garavini
 Women's doubles:  Sofia Cimatti &  Flaminia Daina
 February 22 & 23: #4 in  Marsa Alam
 Men's doubles:  Pedro Maio &  Alexander Bailer
 Women's doubles:  Manuela Cunha &  Angelina Gordienko
 February 24 & 25: #5 in  Nijmegen
 Men's doubles:  Maksimilians Niklass Andersons &  Nikita Burmakin
 Women's doubles:  Julia Chubarova &  Ekaterina Kamenetckaia
 March 3 & 4: #6 in  Casablanca
 Men's doubles:  Dennis Valmori &  Diego Gallini
 Women's doubles:  Marika Colonna &  Alice Grandi
 March 9 & 10: #7 in  Moscow
 Men's doubles:  Nikita Burmakin &  Sergey Kuptsov
 Women's doubles:  Daria Churakova &  Irina Glimakova
 March 9–11: #8 in  Saint-Pierre
 Men's doubles:  Romain Hoarau &  John Wolff
 Women's doubles:  Mathilde Hoarau &  Elodie Vadel
 March 24 & 25: #9 in  Monopoli
 Men's doubles:  Doriano Beccaccioli &  Davide Benussi
 Women's doubles:  Veronica Casadei &  Nicole Nobile

References

External links
Official website of the Association of Tennis Professionals (ATP)
Official website of the Women's Tennis Association (WTA)
Official website of the International Tennis Federation (ITF)
Official website of the International Team Competition in Men's Tennis (Davis Cup)
Official website of the International Team Competition in Women's Tennis (Fed Cup)

 
Tennis by year
2018 sport-related lists